Tariq Aziz (1936–2015) was the Deputy Prime Minister of Iraq under Saddam Hussein.

Tariq Aziz or Tareq Aziz may also refer to:

Tariq Aziz (cricketer) (born 1974), Pakistani cricketer
Tariq Aziz (TV personality) (1936–2020), Pakistani television host
Tariq Aziz (field hockey, born 1938), Pakistani field hockey player
Tariq Aziz (field hockey, born 1984), Pakistani field hockey player
Tareq Aziz (born 1983), Bangladeshi cricketer